Basinger is a German surname. Notable people with the surname include:

 Barbara Fugger (1419–1497), born Barbara Basinger, German businessperson and banker
 David Basinger (fl. from 1986), American academic
 Jeanine Basinger (born 1936), American film historian
 Kim Basinger (born 1953), American actress
 Michael Basinger (born 1951), American football player 
 Simon Basinger (born 1957), French musicologist and essayist
 William Starr Basinger (1827–1910), American lawyer and scholar

See also

German-language surnames